Ellembelle is a parliamentary constituency in Ghana. Emmanuel Armah Kofi Buah is the member of parliament for the constituency. He was elected on the ticket of the National Democratic Congress (NDC) with a majority of 1,649 votes. He took over from Freddie Blay, who had represented the constituency on the ticket of the Convention People's Party (CPP).

See also
List of Ghana Parliament constituencies

References 

Parliamentary constituencies in the Western Region (Ghana)